The Islamic Center of America (Arabic: ٱلْمَرْكَز ٱلْإِسْلَامِيّ فِي أَمْرِيكَا‎, al-Markaz al-ʾIslāmīy Fī ʾAmrīkā) is a mosque located in Dearborn, Michigan. The 120,000 sq. ft. facility is the largest mosque in North America and the oldest purpose-built Shia mosque in the United States, and the second oldest mosque after 'Asser El Jadeed which originally opened in 1924 in Michigan City, Indiana. Although the institution dates back to 1963, the center's current mosque opened in 2005. It is the largest mosque in North America and the oldest Shia mosque in the United States. With its large Shia Arab population (consisting mostly of Iraqis and Lebanese), Dearborn is often called the "heart of Muslims", especially Shi'ism, in the United States.

The Islamic Center of America is located at 19500 Ford Road in Dearborn. The institution was founded in 1949 by Muhammad Jawad Chirri, who remained its director until his death in 1994.

History

The growing number of Muslims in the Detroit area in the mid-20th century sought out a religious leader from the Middle East to serve the community.  Imam Muhammad Chirri of Lebanon was invited to lead the newly-formed Islamic Center Foundation Society, which would later turn into the Islamic Center of Detroit, and later the Islamic Center of America.  The center first opened its doors at a location in Detroit on September 20, 1963 with financial support from the local community who pledged their homes as collateral along with a gift from Egyptian President Gamal Abdel Nasser. The property for the construction of the Joy Road Mosque was purchased from the Ford Motor Company.  Imam Hassan Al-Qazwini led the center in 1997, several years after Imam Chirri's passing, and assumed the role of religious leader for 18 years. The Islamic Center of America outgrew its original Detroit location and in 2005 moved to its present location on Ford Road in Dearborn.  The Detroit mosque at the center's original site is now known as the Az-Zahra Center, where prayers services are still offered.

2007 vandalism
The mosque was vandalized in January 2007 with anti-Shia graffiti. Many in the community believed that the vandalism was the result of recurrent sectarian tensions with the American Sunni Muslim community over the Iraq War and its Shia–Sunni conflict.

2011 mosque bombing plot

On January 24, 2011, an Imperial Beach, California man named Roger Stockham was arrested and charged with terrorism after attempting to blow up the Islamic Center of America. Stockham was reported to be a convert to Sunni Islam who was targeting the Shia community, and had a history of mental illness and firearms offenses.

Pastor Terry Jones rally

On April 21, 2011, the day before the scheduled appearance of Pastor Terry Jones, hundreds of people from different faiths gathered in a show of solidarity. Jews, Christians and other faith groups stood side by side with inter-locked arms in opposition to Jones' planned protest.

School and Education
The mosque operates the Muslim American Youth Academy (MAYA), an Islamic private elementary and middle school.

Architecture 
The Islamic Center of America is a 120,000 sq. ft. religious space.

·       Meeting hall

·       Industrial kitchen

·       Prayer room

·       High ceiling and calligraphy embraided domes

·       Mezzanine for women

·       Offices

·       Meeting rooms

·       Contains a library

·       Educational Programs run by Imam Hassan Qazwini

See also
Islam in Metro Detroit
List of mosques in the United States

References

External links

"In the Way of the Prophet: Ideologies and Institutions in Dearborn, Michigan, America's Muslim Capitol", at AmericanCity.org (Retrieved February 16, 2009)

Arab-American culture in Michigan
Iraqi-American history
Lebanese-American history
Mosques in Michigan
Mosque buildings with domes
Buildings and structures in Dearborn, Michigan
Mosques completed in 2005
Islamic organizations established in 1963
Shia Islam in the United States
Shia mosques in the United States
Islam in Metro Detroit